Milhaud is a French family name of geographic origin from Milhaud, a small commune of 5,611 population (2008) in France's Gard. The place name Milhaud is derived from the Roman family name Aemilius with the suffix -avus.

The surname may refer to the following people:
Darius Milhaud (1892–1974), French composer and teacher
Edgard Milhaud (1873–1964), French professor of economics
Édouard Jean Baptiste Milhaud (1766–1833), French politician and army general
Madeleine Milhaud (1902–2008), French actress and librettist, wife of the composer Milhaud
Gaston Milhaud (1858–1918), French philosopher and historian of science

References

French-language surnames